The APA International Humanitarian Award is an award of the American Psychological Association that "recognizes extraordinary humanitarian service and activism by a psychologist or a team of psychologists, including professional and/or volunteer work conducted primarily in the field with underserved populations."

Recipients
Source: APA
1998/1999 Nila Kapor-Stanulovic
2001 Karen L. Hanscom
2002 Elizabeth Lira
2004 Chris E. Stout
2005 Eduardo Almeida
2006 Center for Victims of Torture -- Guinea International Mental Health Team
2007 Gerard A. (Jerry) Jacobs
2008 Joseph Prewitt Diaz, Gundelina Velazco
2009 Michael Wessells
2012 John Thoburn
2013 M. Brinton Lykes
2014 Malcolm MacLachlan
2015 Sunil Bhatia
2016 Alan Poling
2017 Kathryn L. Norsworthy
2018 Guerda M. Nicolas
2019 Gargi Roysircar
2020 Niels Peter Rygaard 
2021 Bhava Nath Poudya 
2022 Lucy Wairimu Mukuria

See also

 List of psychology awards

References 

American Psychological Association
American psychology awards
Humanitarian and service awards